Velimir Radinović (born January 17, 1981) is a Canadian-Serbian former professional basketball player. He is a 2.12 center.

External links
 Velimir Radinović at eurobasket.com
 Velimir Radinović at German league

1981 births
Living people
Canadian expatriate basketball people in Germany
Canadian expatriate basketball people in Greece
Canadian expatriate basketball people in France
Canadian expatriate basketball people in Serbia
Canadian expatriate basketball people in the United States
Canadian men's basketball players
Canadian people of Serbian descent
Centers (basketball)
Iraklis Thessaloniki B.C. players
KK FMP (1991–2011) players
KK Hemofarm players
Mitteldeutscher BC players
Ohio State Buckeyes men's basketball players
Serbian expatriate basketball people in Germany
Serbian expatriate basketball people in Greece
Serbian expatriate basketball people in France
Serbian expatriate basketball people in the United States
Serbian men's basketball players
Sportspeople from Oakville, Ontario
Tigers Tübingen players